Joseph Marie Garavel (c. 1824 – 9 October 1885) was a French Roman Catholic missionary in New Zealand. He was born in Chambéry, France.

References

1824 births
1885 deaths
French Roman Catholic missionaries
Clergy from Chambéry
French emigrants to New Zealand
Roman Catholic missionaries in New Zealand